Top Star. ¿Cuánto vale tu voz? ("Top Star. How much is your voice worth?") is a Spanish singing reality competition series created and produced jointly by Fremantle and Mediaset España. It premiered on Mediaset's flagship channel Telecinco on May 7, 2021.

Due to poor ratings, the show was pulled from its original Friday night time slot after two episodes, and later rescheduled for Saturdays starting May 29.

Premise
Each episode features performances by a total of nine contestants split into three categories. For each category, the mentors have €30,000 to bid for the contestants during or after their performances. If none of the mentors places a bid for them, the contestant is immediately eliminated. Otherwise, the highest bidder backs the contestant, who then will face the scrutiny of "The 50", the members of the studio audience. The contestant who receives the most favorable votes from "The 50" advances to the final round later in the night, where "The 50" vote again to determine the weekly winner who will advance to the finale and win the money their backer bid for them.

Host and mentors
The show is hosted in its first season by Jesús Vázquez, with Danna Paola, Isabel Pantoja and Risto Mejide serving as the mentors who bid for the contestants.

Season 1 (2021)

Week 1 (May 7)

Week 2 (May 14)

Week 3 (May 29)

Week 4 (June 5)

(*) Won because of being the first bidder during the performance.

Week 5 (June 12)

(*) Won because of being the first bidder during the performance.

Week 6 (June 19)

Week 7 (June 26)

Finale (July 3)
For the first round of the finale, the mentors would have to pick one contestant and bid all their money for them once all seven contestants had performed. Each of them had €5,000 for each time one of their backed contestants had won during the season. Each of the finalists would compete for that amount plus an additional €10,000.

Ratings

References

Telecinco original programming
2021 Spanish television series debuts
Television series by Fremantle (company)